A Dangerous Affair is a 1995 American made-for-television thriller film starring Connie Sellecca and Gregory Harrison and directed by Alan Metzger. It premiered on ABC on January 1, 1995.

Plot
Sharon Blake is a successful career woman who meets real-estate agent Robert Kenzer while attending a party and they soon begin a passionate affair. But when she ends the affair, Sharon finds herself being stalked and harassed by her obsessed ex-lover who becomes violent and delusional.

Cast
Connie Sellecca as Sharon Blake
Gregory Harrison as Robert Kenzer
Christopher Meloni as Tommy Moretti
Rosalind Cash as Dr. Robertson
John Marshall Jones as Detective Weber
Jo de Winter as Sharon's Mother
Robin Bartlett as Martha

References

External links

1995 television films
1995 films
1995 thriller films
1990s American films
1990s English-language films
ABC network original films
American thriller television films
Films about harassment
Films about stalking
Films directed by Alan Metzger
Films scored by David Mansfield